Aliabad-e Sadat may refer to:
 Aliabad-e Sadat, Anbarabad
 Aliabad-e Sadat, Rafsanjan